The 51st General Assembly of Prince Edward Island was in session from November 23, 1966, to March 26, 1970. The Liberal Party led by Alex Campbell formed the government.

Prosper Arsenault was elected speaker.

There were five sessions of the 51st General Assembly:

Members

Kings

Prince

Queens

Notes:

References
 Election results for the Prince Edward Island Legislative Assembly, 1966-05-30
 O'Handley, Kathryn Canadian Parliamentary Guide, 1994 

Terms of the General Assembly of Prince Edward Island
1966 establishments in Prince Edward Island
1970 disestablishments in Prince Edward Island